Charles J. Fulton (27 January 1860 – 6 December 1937) was an American politician from Iowa. 

Fulton was born in Jefferson County on 27 January 1860, and attended Parsons College in Fairfield. After graduating in 1883, he traveled south, finding employment in sales throughout Texas and Oklahoma. Fulton returned to Fairfield in 1891, and worked for the Louden Machinery Company. He served on municipal and county school boards, as well as on the board of trustees of Parsons College before pursuing further public service as mayor of Fairfield. Fulton was a longtime member of the board for the Fairfield Public Library, serving as secretary between 1892 and 1930, then as president thereafter. Between 1909 and 1913, Fulton was a Republican member of the Iowa House of Representatives for District 19. He stepped down as a state representative after two full terms. Fulton subsequently won election to the Iowa Senate in 1920, and was reelected in 1924. During his tenure as a state senator, he represented District 2. Fulton died in Fairfield on 6 December 1937.

References

Mayors of places in Iowa
Iowa Republicans
1937 deaths
19th-century American businesspeople
School board members in Iowa
1860 births
People from Fairfield, Iowa
Businesspeople from Iowa
20th-century American politicians
20th-century American businesspeople
American salespeople
Parsons College alumni